Sir Kenneth Russell Cork GBE (21 August 191313 October 1991) was a British accountant and insolvency expert, and the Lord Mayor of London from 1978–1979.  He is best known for chairing a major review of UK insolvency law (whose report issued in 1982 is widely referred to as the Cork Report and led to the passing of the Insolvency Act 1986).

He was a partner in Cork Gully, a well-known firm of insolvency practitioners (established in 1935 with his father, WH Cork, and Harry Gully) which in 1980 became part of Coopers & Lybrand. Cork was recognised as an "insolvency baron" who had a dominant role in that field which set him apart from mainstream accountancy.

Prior to his election of Mayor he had served as a sheriff of London for 1975–76.

He also contributed to governance of the arts, as Vice Chairman of the Arts Council and Chairman of the Royal Shakespeare Company, and guiding other bodies including the Philharmonia Orchestra and London Festival Ballet.

Family
Sir Kenneth's son, Sir Roger Cork (31 March 1947 – 21 October 2002), followed in his footsteps, both as a partner in Cork Gully and as Lord Mayor of London (1996–1997).

Publications
Cork on Cork: Sir Kenneth Cork Takes Stock.

References 

1913 births
1991 deaths
People educated at Alleyn Court School
Sheriffs of the City of London
20th-century lord mayors of London
20th-century English politicians
British accountants
Knights Grand Cross of the Order of the British Empire